The Catalan State was a short-lived state proclaimed during the events of 6 October 1934 by Lluís Companys as the "Catalan State within the Spanish Federal Republic".

Background

On 6 October 1934 the President of the Generalitat of Catalonia, Lluís Companys (ERC), proclaimed the Catalan State within the Spanish Federal Republic. The event was part of a semi-insurrectional program of the left against the new Spanish right-wing republican government led by Alejandro Lerroux, which incorporated as ministers some members of the right-wing CEDA, Spanish political party that at the time was considered close to fascism and, therefore, they feared that it was the first step of this party to take power as Hitler and Mussolini had in Germany and Italy.

Proclamation
In the afternoon of October 6, Lluís Companys appeared on the balcony of the Generalitat accompanied by his advisers and proclaimed the Catalan Republic.

In this solemn hour, in the name of the people and the Parliament, the Government over which I preside assumes all the faculties of power in Catalonia, proclaims the Catalan State of the Spanish Federal Republic, and in establishing and fortifying relations with the leaders of the general protest against Fascism, invites them to establish in Catalonia the provisional Government of the Republic, which will find in our Catalan people the most generous impulse of fraternity in the common desire to erect a free and magnificent federal republic.

The attempt was quickly aborted by the Spanish government. General Domènec Batet, chief of the IV Organic Division in Catalonia, crushed the uprising. Companys was arrested and imprisoned; the autonomous government suspended, and virtually all its members jailed. After the Popular Front victory in the February 1936 Spanish general election, his government was pardoned and reinstated in their functions.

Consequences
In the failed rebellion forty-six people died: thirty-eight civilians and eight soldiers. More than three thousand people were imprisoned, most of them in the "Uruguay" steamer, and placed under the jurisdiction of the councils of war. Azaña was also arrested, who happened to be in Barcelona to attend the funerals of the former minister of his cabinet, Jaume Carner. The soldiers who had taken part of the insurrection, the commander Enric Pérez Farràs and the captains Escofet and Ricart, were condemned to death, their sentence being commuted to life imprisonment by the President of the Republic, Alcalá Zamora, in spite of the protests of both the CEDA and the Republican Liberal Democrat Party of Melquiades Álvarez, who demanded a strong hand. The President and the Government of the Generalitat were tried by the Constitutional Guarantees Tribunal and were sentenced for military rebellion to thirty years in prison, which was carried out by some in the Cartagena prison and others in the Puerto de Santa María . On February 23, 1935, the Mayor of Barcelona and the detained councilors were provisionally released.

The government of Lerroux unleashed "a harsh repressive wave with the closure of political and trade union centers, the suppression of newspapers, the removal of municipalities and thousands of detainees, without having had a direct action on the facts", which showed "a punitive will often arbitrary and with vengeance components of class or ideological".

Catalan autonomy was suspended indefinitely by a law passed on December 14 at the proposal of the Government (the CEDA demanded the repeal of the Statute) and the Generalitat of Catalonia was replaced by a Council of the Generalitat appointed by the Government and presided by a Governor General of Catalonia (the first was Colonel Francisco Jiménez Arenas, who acted as "accidental president" of the Generalitat since October 7, and who in January 1935 was replaced by Manuel Portela Valladares). In April 1935, when the state of war was lifted, Portela was replaced by the radical Joan Pich i Pon, and some of the powers of the Generalitat were returned to him, but not those of Public Order. The Catalan League participated in that government, "which confirmed its image as an accomplice of the enemies of autonomy and alienated middle class sectors from it, although at the same time, since the end of October, it denounced the central government for taking advantage of the situation created to suppress or reduce the autonomous faculties, maintaining that "a people should not be punished for the mistakes of their rulers". In the name of the Lliga, the vice-president of the Catalan parliament, A. Martínez Domingo, challenged before the Guarantees Court the law of January 2, 1935, which emptied the Generalitat of its contents".

The Crop Contracts Law was annulled and almost three thousand eviction lawsuits of "rabassaires" and sharecroppers were processed. The left-wing Catalan nationalist newspapers were suspended.

References

States and territories established in 1934
History of Catalonia
Politics of Catalonia
1934 establishments in Spain
1934 disestablishments in Europe
Former countries in Spanish history
Federalism in Spain